Marek Gorzelniak (born 12 July 1968) is a Polish weightlifter. He competed at the 1992 Summer Olympics and the 1996 Summer Olympics.

References

1968 births
Living people
Polish male weightlifters
Olympic weightlifters of Poland
Weightlifters at the 1992 Summer Olympics
Weightlifters at the 1996 Summer Olympics
People from Legnica
20th-century Polish people
21st-century Polish people